Saladino's Foodservice is a privately owned foodservice distributor based in Fresno, California. They are currently the largest independent foodservice distributor in California, and the 19th largest foodservice distributor in the United States.

History
Saladino's came to life in 1944 through Chairman of the Board, Don Saladino. Working in the meat department of his father's grocery store in Fresno, California, Saladino combined his meat packing experience with family recipes from the Calabrese region in Italy to form the Saladino's Sausage Company. In the beginning, Saladino focused primarily on distributing sausage products to local grocery stores. In 1980, Don's son and current President, Craig Saladino, joined the business and they expanded their products to include a wider variety of sausage and meat products while also beginning distribution to local pizzerias and restaurants.

In 2001 they moved to a larger facility located farther north in Fresno and took on their largest customer, the restaurant chain Subway. Since this move in 2001 they have expanded their operations to include additional warehouses located in Ontario, California and West Sacramento, California. They currently distribute throughout the entirety of California, as well as parts of Arizona, Nevada, Idaho and Oregon.

References

1980 establishments in California
Catering and food service companies of the United States
Companies based in Fresno, California
Retail companies established in 1980
Privately held companies based in California
Distributors
Companies established in 1980
Food and drink companies established in 1980
Food and drink companies based in California
1980 establishments in the United States